Prunus yunnanensis, the Yunnan cherry is a species of Prunus native to Yunnan, Guangxi, Sichuan and adjacent provinces of southeast China, preferring to grow at 1900–2600m. The white flowers open at the same time as the leaves bud out, or very slightly before. It flowers from March to May, and fruits two months after.

Description
It is an often many-stemmed tree, usually 4 to 8m tall, but ranging from 3 to 9m. Its bark is gray, with brownishgray branchlets and green young twigs. The leaves have a 6 to 12mm petiole, and are elliptic, oblong, obovateoblong or ovateoblong, from 3.5 to 6cm long and 2 to 3.5cm wide. The leaves are a darker green on the top surface. Typically the inflorescences have 3 to 9 flowers borne on subcorymbose racemes or long racemes. Each flower has 33–45 stamens. The fruit, a drupe, is purplish red, 7 to 10mm by 5 to 8mm.

Uses
It is planted as an ornamental street tree in Kunming, the capital of Yunnan.

Notes

References

External links

yunnanensis
Ornamental trees
Endemic flora of China
Plants described in 1889